The 5th Shanghai International Film Festival was film festival held between June 9 and June 17, 2001. 164 films were screened including 46 from China. 14 films were entered into the Golden Cup competition, with Antitrust from the United States winning the grand prize.

The Festival utilized 9 theaters, which held 479 screenings to an aggregate audience of 170,000. 

This marked the last time the Shanghai International Film Festival was held on a biannual basis. Beginning with 2001, the festival was held on an annual basis.

Jury
Zhu Yongde, Chairman of China Film Producers Association (China) (Jury president)
Eberhard Junkersdorf, film producer (Germany)
Alan Parker, director (United Kingdom)
Andrzej Zulawski, director (Poland)
Gleb Panfilov, director (Russia)
Lee Chang-Dong, director (South Korea)
Pan Hong, actress (China)

In competition

Awards

Golden Goblet
Best Film- Antitrust (USA)
Best Director- Peter Howitt (for Antitrust) (USA)
Best Actor- Daniel Auteuil for The Closet (France)
Best Actress- 
Peng Yu for The Full Moon (China)
Stanilawa Celinska for Money is not Everything (Poland)
Best Music- Clande Samard (Bo Ba Bu) (Uzbekistan)
Best Technology- Michale Ballhans (The Legend of Bagger Vance) (USA)

External links
5th SIFF at the Internet Movie Database

Shanghai International Film Festival, 2001
Shanghai International Film Festival, 2001
Shanghai International Film Festival, 2001
Shanghai International Film Festival
21st century in Shanghai